Mats Wilander defeated Henri Leconte in the final, 7–5, 6–2, 6–1 to win the men's singles tennis title at the 1988 French Open. It was his third and final French Open singles title. Leconte remains the most recent Frenchman to reach the final.

Ivan Lendl was the two-time defending champion, but lost in the quarterfinals to Jonas Svensson.

Seeds
The seeded players are listed below. Mats Wilander is the champion; others show the round in which they were eliminated.

  Ivan Lendl (quarterfinals)
  Stefan Edberg (fourth round)
  Mats Wilander (champion)
  Pat Cash (fourth round)
  Boris Becker (fourth round)
  Yannick Noah (fourth round)
  Kent Carlsson (fourth round)
  Tim Mayotte (second round)
  Andre Agassi (semifinals)
  Anders Järryd (first round)
  Henri Leconte (finalist)
  Emilio Sánchez (quarterfinals)
  Andrés Gómez (second round)
  Andrei Chesnokov (quarterfinals)
  Guillermo Pérez Roldán (quarterfinals)
  John McEnroe (fourth round)

Draw

Finals

Section 1

Section 2

Section 3

Section 4

Section 5

Section 6

Section 7

Section 8

External links
 Association of Tennis Professionals (ATP) – 1988 French Open Men's Singles draw
1988 French Open – Men's draws and results at the International Tennis Federation

Men's Singles
1988
1988 Grand Prix (tennis)